The Gutbrod Atlas was a light panel van or pickup truck made by the Calw division of Gutbrod Motorenbau G.m.b.H.. In 1950, its series production started in Calw, Germany. The vehicle's maximum permissible payload was either 700, 800, or 1000 kg. Top speed was 70 km/h (44 mph) with a fuel consumption of 9.8 l/100 km (24 mpg US); the fuel had an oil/gasoline ratio of 1:25. The Atlas was fitted with a 27 liter fuel tank.

The pilot production commenced in late 1949. Only in front did the vehicle have shock absorbers. A 400 mm steering wheel in with a 11:1 steering ratio was used. The Atlas has a 6 volts starter motor and a 75 Ah battery. Tires with a size of 5.50×16" were used. The vehicle's turning radius was 9.6 m (31.5 ft). The doors used were suicide doors, making the vehicle look very similar to its competitors Tempo Matador / Wiking and Goliath GV800. The VW T1 also competed the marked.

The following variations were produced:
 Atlas 800, January 1950 – February 1953
 Atlas 800/H, February 1953 – Mid 1954
 Atlas 1000, June 1951 – Mid 1954
 Atlas 1000/3, February 1953 – Mid 1954
 Atlas 700, June 1953 – Mid 1954

In April 1954, Gutbrod went bankrupt, and the vehicle production came to an end.

References

External links 
 1950 Gutbrod Atlas 800 Pritsche - Classic-Gala Schwetzingen 2016, Automobile Classics, YouTube, 12 October 2016

Vehicles introduced in 1950
Minivans
Vans
Minibuses
Pickup trucks
Cab over vehicles
Rear-wheel-drive vehicles
Rear-engined vehicles
Cars introduced in 1950
1950s cars